The men's team sabre event of the 2011 World Fencing Championships took place on October 14, 2011.

Medalists

Draw

Finals

Top half

Bottom half

Placement matches

5–8th place

9–12th place

13–16th place

External links
 Bracket

2011 World Fencing Championships